Laurent Seret (11 June 1896 – 9 February 1978) was a Belgian racing cyclist. He rode in the 1923 Tour de France.

References

1896 births
1978 deaths
Belgian male cyclists
Place of birth missing